The slate-coloured seedeater (Sporophila schistacea) is a bird species in the family Thraupidae.

Distribution
The bird's natural habitats are subtropical or tropical moist lowland forests, and heavily degraded former forests.

It is found in southern parts of Central America, the southwestern Amazon Basin, Colombia, Venezuela, Trinidad and Tobago and the Guianas.

References

slate-coloured seedeater
Birds of Central America
Birds of Colombia
Birds of Venezuela
Birds of Trinidad and Tobago
Birds of the Guianas
Birds of the Peruvian Amazon
Birds of the Ecuadorian Amazon
slate-coloured seedeater
Taxonomy articles created by Polbot